Paul Morgan may refer to:

 Paul Morgan (architect), Australian architect
 Paul Morgan (engineer) (1948–2001), British engineer
 Paul Morgan (footballer) (born 1978), Northern Irish association footballer
 Paul Morgan (journalist), British sports journalist
 Paul Morgan (rugby league) (died 2001), Australian rugby league footballer and administrator
 Paul Morgan (rugby) (1974–2015), Welsh rugby union and rugby league footballer of the 1990s and 2000s
 Paul Morgan (priest) (born 1964), superior of the British district of the Society of St Pius X
 Paul Morgan (actor) (1886–1938), Austrian actor and Kabarett performer
 Paul Morgan (judge) (born 1952), judge of the High Court of England and Wales